Juglans sigillata, also called iron walnut, is the second most cultivated species of walnut tree after the Persian walnut Juglans regia. Commonly distributed in the eastern Himalayas and western China. The tree has been cultivated for its edible nuts, and there are at least 80 authorised or approved cultivars produced after successful implementation of grafting technology. 

This plant was first detected by the Chinese botanist Kuang Keren (K.Z. Kuang) and Lu Anmin (A.M.Lu) in 1979, named after a French botanist Louis-Albert Dode.

The nuts are oval-shaped with bumps and seal-like depressions (sigillatae) in the shell, and with its thick shell the species has been termed the "iron walnut". The tree is also used for its wood. It is commonly found in Yunnan, China's top walnut producing region in terms of acreage and yield, but are also found in Guizhou, Sichuan and Xizang in China. It is sometimes grown in gardens and parks as an ornamental plant.

A 536.50-Mb genome has been sequenced to provide a solid foundation for additional genomic studies in nut crops and related species, as well providing valuable resources for plant breeders. Demonstrating an estimated divergence time between J. sigillata and the more widely cultivated Juglans regia 49 million years ago.

References

External links
Iron walnut (Juglans sigillata) info

sigillata